Ansis Epners (1937–2003) was a Latvian documentarian. He made more than sixty films, of which a number received the Lielais Kristaps award.

References

1937 births
2003 deaths